Seetha Kalyanam is a 1934 Tamil-language film produced by Prabhat Film Company. It was the first film for musicians Papanasam Sivan, S. Rajam and S. Balachander. The film was remade in Telugu in the same year. The film is known to be the first ever Tamil film to be released in colour.

Plot 
Sita Kalyanam is the story of Sita's (S. Jayalakshmi) swayamvara. Sita's father King Janaka (V. Sundaram Iyer) arranges a swayamvara for his daughter. He announces a contest and declares that whoever can wield Shiva Dhanush (Shiva's bow) will be given Seetha's hand in marriage. After several kings and princes fail to do so, Rama (S. Rajam), the prince of Ayodhya, wields the bow and marries Sita.

Production 
The film was made under the banner of Prabhat Film Company. V. Shantaram wanted to make a Tamil film using his sets from his 1933 Marathi film Sairandhri. Sairandhri was a financial failure and Shantaram was looking to underwrite its cost by making a Tamil film reusing its sets at Kolhapur. He wrote to Sound and Shadow, a Chennai-based movie magazine asking for help. The people who ran the magazine — film directors Murugadasa (Muthuswamy Iyer), A. K. Sekhar, K. Ramnoth, and G. K. Seshagiri, their financial backer — agreed to help Shantaram. The four of them with V. Sundaram Iyer and his children — S. Jayalakshmi, S. Rajam and Veenai S. Balachander — went to Kolhapur to participate in the new film. The children's music tutor, Papanasam Sivan was hired to write the lyrics for the songs. Shantaram's cousin, Baburao Pendharkar directed the film with K. Ramnoth as his assistant. The film was later remade in Telugu with a different set of actors, with K. Ramnoth as cinematographer and A. K. Sekhar as art director. The songs were not pre-recorded. They were recorded live on the set with the actors singing them in their own voices, while the orchestra players played their instruments beyond the camera range. Instruments which could be carried easily — like the harmonium, violin, flute, tabla and clarinet — were mostly used.

Cast 
 S. Rajam – Rama
 S. Jayalakshmi – Sita
V. Sundaram Iyer – Janaka
 T. V. Seetharama Iyer – Dasaratha
 P. Venkata Rao – Viswamitra
G. K. Seshagiri
Kamala – Kaikeyi
Rajam – Kausalya
S. Saraswathi – Urmila
S. Balachander – Musician at Ravana's Court

Reception 
The film was very popular and became a hit. S. Rajam and S. Balachander became famous and came to be known as "Prabhat prodigy stars". The film created a controversy among conservatives for having a brother and sister duo star as husband and wife.

References

External links 
 

1934 films
Films based on the Ramayana
Hindu mythological films
1930s Tamil-language films
Films scored by Papanasam Sivan
Indian drama films
1934 drama films
Indian black-and-white films
Films scored by Gali Penchala Narasimha Rao